Ingrid Goes West is a 2017 American black comedy drama film directed by Matt Spicer and written by Spicer and David Branson Smith. The film stars Aubrey Plaza, Elizabeth Olsen, Billy Magnussen, Wyatt Russell, Pom Klementieff, and O'Shea Jackson Jr., and follows a young woman who moves to Los Angeles in an effort to befriend her Instagram idol.

The film premiered in competition at the 2017 Sundance Film Festival, where it won the Waldo Salt Screenwriting Award. It had a limited release in the United States on August 11, 2017, by Neon, grossing $3 million. The film received positive reviews, with many praising the script, dark themes, humor, and performances.

Plot 
Ingrid Thorburn, a mentally unstable young woman in Pennsylvania, is shown crashing the wedding of an Instagram influencer named Charlotte, whom she angrily pepper sprays. Ingrid is sent to a recovery facility where she "writes" to Charlotte as if they are friends, when in reality, Charlotte only commented on one of Ingrid’s pictures once.

After being released from the facility, Ingrid learns of another social media influencer named Taylor Sloane from a magazine article. Using money she inherited from her recently deceased mother, Ingrid travels to Los Angeles. She ends up renting a house in Venice from Dan Pinto, an aspiring screenwriter, and gets a makeover to emulate Taylor’s style.

Ingrid familiarizes herself with the shops and cafés Taylor frequents, which leads to a sighting of Taylor at her favorite bookstore. Ingrid follows Taylor home and kidnaps her dog, Rothko. After Taylor puts up "lost dog" posters in the neighborhood, Ingrid returns Rothko, claiming she found him. A grateful Taylor invites Ingrid to have dinner with her and her artist husband Ezra, and a friendship between the women is fostered. The next day, Ingrid asks to borrow Dan’s truck so she can help Taylor move some belongings to her vacation home in Joshua Tree. Dan grudgingly relents, on the condition that Ingrid return that evening to take part in a table read of his screenplay. Taylor and Ingrid spend the night partying together, and on the way home, Ingrid damages the truck while driving under the influence. Ingrid tells Taylor the truck belongs to her boyfriend, Dan. She returns it the following morning to a furious Dan, who was forced to cancel his table read.

Ingrid and Taylor begin regularly hanging out and their bond grows. One day at Taylor and Ezra’s house, Ingrid meets Nicky, Taylor's brother. Nicky is an obnoxious drug addict who regards Ingrid with suspicion about her motives. Taylor dismisses previous plans with Ingrid to attend a party with Nicky, furthering Ingrid's disdain for him. Taylor and Nicky tease Ingrid about her "imaginary" boyfriend Dan, whom they've never met. They invite Ingrid to a party that weekend at fashion blogger Harley Chung's house and tell her to bring Dan.

In an effort to make amends with Dan, Ingrid promises to reimburse him for the truck's damage and takes him out to dinner. Later that night, after bonding over their past losses, the two have sex and begin a relationship. Ingrid invites Dan to Harley's party and asks him to tell everyone he's her boyfriend. Once there, Ingrid becomes envious of Taylor and Harley's friendship. After a conversation with Ezra, Ingrid begins to realize that several aspects of Taylor's persona are fabricated. Nicky spies Ingrid using Taylor's birthday as her phone password and steals the phone, where he finds several incriminating photographs that reveal her obsession with Taylor. Nicky uses this knowledge to blackmail Ingrid for money. 

In retaliation, Ingrid convinces Dan to kidnap and terrorize Nicky to keep him quiet. Nicky escapes his bindings and attacks Dan, leading Ingrid to stun Nicky with a crowbar. Ingrid rushes Dan to the hospital and leaves Nicky unconscious in the desert. Later, Ingrid sees on Instagram that Taylor and Ezra went to Joshua Tree. She decides to drive there and surprise them, but no one is home. Ingrid tries to call Taylor, but Ezra answers and tells Ingrid that Nicky has told them what happened, that Taylor does not want to hear from her again, and that she would have been arrested if Nicky had not been trying to hide his own crimes.

A desperate Ingrid moves into the small house next door to Taylor, using the remaining chunk of her inheritance. Unable to pay the bills, she eventually loses power at the house. After noticing a Halloween party at Taylor's place, she dons a bed sheet and wig and crashes the party to charge her phone. When discovered, Ingrid berates Nicky, Ezra, and Taylor for fabricating aspects of their own lives. Taylor responds that because of her façade, she and Ingrid were never truly friends. She suggests Ingrid seek professional help and banishes her from the party before leaving, Ingrid recriminates Taylor, telling her that she is a fake, that her brother is a drug addict and that she is a selfish narcissist who lies to get attention, telling her that she is worse than her. Bereft, Ingrid retreats back to her home next door. Surrounded by lit candles, she records a video for her public Instagram page in which she tearfully confesses her past deception and admits she knows there is something wrong with her, but feels hopeless about how to deal with it and is unsure if she can change. She ends the video by saying she was sick of being alone and that she only wanted to have friends, before attempting suicide with an overdose of pills.

Ingrid survives after Dan sees the video in time and calls emergency services. She wakes in the hospital to find Dan waiting for her, and they rekindle their relationship. He gladly informs Ingrid that her video has gone viral, and thousands of strangers have responded to her hashtag #iamingrid to show support. As Ingrid scrolls through all the love and support for her on social media, a smile starts to spread across her face.

Cast 
 Aubrey Plaza as Ingrid Thorburn, a mentally unstable woman with attachment issues, obsessed with social media.
 Elizabeth Olsen as Taylor Sloane, a popular, narcissistic social media influencer with whom Ingrid becomes obsessed.
 O'Shea Jackson Jr. as Daniel "Dan" Pinto, an aspiring screenwriter and Ingrid's landlord.
 Wyatt Russell as Ezra O'Keefe, a painter and Taylor's husband.
 Billy Magnussen as Nicky Sloane, a drug addict and Taylor's brother.
 Pom Klementieff as Harley Chung, a fashion blogger.

Production

Development 
Matt Spicer and David Branson Smith said the script was inspired by "our mutual obsession with Instagram and how it brings out the worst in us, making us feel bad about ourselves, while also being wildly entertaining and addictive." Some of the films Spicer and Smith drew inspiration from included The Talented Mr. Ripley, Taxi Driver, and Single White Female. Smith and Spicer considered writing the film from the perspective of an influencer being stalked, but ultimately decided to write it from the stalker's point of view. Spicer said, "Ingrid represents all of our worst instincts when it comes to social media. Taylor, on the other hand, doesn't want to see through it — she's happy to have this sidekick who looks up to her and tells her how cool and smart she is. You start the movie thinking they're polar opposites but at the end you hopefully come to realize that they're the same."

Casting 
Aubrey Plaza signed on to star in and produce the film. Plaza helped in the casting of O’Shea Jackson Jr. as Dan.

Filming 
Principal photography, which took place over five weeks, began in July 2016 in Los Angeles and wrapped that August in Joshua Tree, California. 

A focal point of the film is a scene set to the song "All My Life" by K-Ci & JoJo. Initially this song was meant to be Seal's "Kiss from a Rose" (which would have tied into the Dan character's obsession with Batman, as it is from the Batman Forever soundtrack), but Seal's asking price for the song was higher than the production could afford. Spicer's sister recommended "All My Life" as a replacement.

Release
Ingrid Goes West had its world premiere at the Sundance Film Festival on January 20, 2017. Shortly after, Neon acquired the North American distribution rights to the film. It was theatrically released on August 11, 2017.

Reception

Box office
Following several weeks in limited release, the film went wide on August 25, 2017, and grossed $3,019,057 from 647 theaters, an average of $1,208 per venue.

Critical response 
Ingrid Goes West garnered positive reviews from film critics. The website's critical consensus reads, "Led by strong performances from Aubrey Plaza and Elizabeth Olsen, Ingrid Goes West delivers smart, topical humor underlined by timely social observations." On Metacritic, the film has a weighted average score of 71 out of 100, based on 39 critics, indicating "generally favorable reviews".

Writing for RogerEbert.com, Sheila O'Malley gave the film 3 and ½ stars out of 4 and said the film is "a biting expose on How We Live Now: sitting on our phones, rote scrolling through someone else's online life, clicking 'Hearts' without even taking a moment to absorb the image. The film lampoons stuff that didn't even exist 10 years ago but has now become such a part of our everyday lives that no one takes a second to consider the potential negative effects. If everything is public, then where is the Self? Is turning yourself into a ‘brand' really a good idea? If you don't take a picture of it and - crucially - share it with the world, did it really happen?" O'Malley also commended Plaza's performance, writing her "real gift is in making Ingrid both hilarious and tragic. She doesn't pull her punches. It's part performance, part social commentary."

The New York Times Ben Kenigsberg said that while the film's commentary on a social media-obsessed culture could have been sharper, "Ms. Plaza is a whiz with timing and does a deft job of shifting viewers’ sympathy; her character can be loathsome or pathetic depending on the scene. O’Shea Jackson Jr., as her Batman-obsessed landlord, is every bit as funny and nearly walks away with the movie."

Criticisms lamented that the film did not go deep enough into exploring Ingrid’s mental health or the roots of her mental illness. Matthew Eng of Little White Lies wrote, "Through Plaza, Spicer’s film achieves the highwire humour it seeks, but its thematic heft is light and its dual depictions of addiction and mental illness are rooted in a reactionary finger-wagging that leaves its antiheroine more diagnosed than explored. Ingrid Goes West is a film that knows that people like Ingrid tell themselves stories in order to live but doesn’t entirely understand why, betraying a gap in knowledge and lived experience that makes for a satire not only lacking teeth but imagination."

Accolades

References

External links 
 
 
 

2017 films
2017 black comedy films
2017 comedy-drama films
2017 directorial debut films
2017 independent films
American independent films
2010s American films
2010s English-language films
2010s satirical films
2010s female buddy films
American black comedy films
American comedy-drama films
American satirical films
Borderline personality disorder in fiction
Films about social media
Films about stalking
Films set in 2016
Films set in Los Angeles
Films shot in Los Angeles
Neon (distributor) films
Sundance Film Festival award winners